667th Heavy Anti-Aircraft Regiment, Royal Artillery (Hampshire) TA was a volunteer air defence unit of Britain's Territorial Army from 1947 until 1954.

History
The regiment was raised when the Territorial Army (TA) was reconstituted in 1947. It was designated 667 HAA Regiment RA (Hampshire) TA with headquarters at Aldershot and equipped with 3.7-inch Anti-Aircraft Guns. It was Aldershot's first, and only, Territorial Army Artillery Regiment. It was raised and commanded from 1947 to 1951 by Lt-Col Howard N. Cole OBE TD. The headquarters of the unit were at one of Aldershot's old cavalry barracks, Beaumont Barracks.

It formed part of 100 Army Group Royal Artillery (AA) (TA) supporting the field army units of the TA (it was therefore not part of Anti-Aircraft Command). 100 AGRA (AA) began to disband on 9 September 1948, completed by 27 September.

667 HAA Regiment was itself disbanded on 1 January 1954.

Notes

References
 Howard N Cole, The Story of Aldershot, Aldershot: Gale and Polden, 1951
 J.B.M. Frederick, Lineage Book of British Land Forces 1660–1978, Vol II, Wakefield, Microform Academic, 1984, .
 Norman E.H. Litchfield, The Territorial Artillery 1908–1988 (Their Lineage, Uniforms and Badges), Nottingham: Sherwood Press, 1992, .
 Brig N.W. Routledge, History of the Royal Regiment of Artillery: Anti-Aircraft Artillery 1914–55, London: Royal Artillery Institution/Brassey's, 1994, .

External sources
 British Army units from 1945 on
 British Military History
 Graham Watson, The Territorial Army 1947

Military units and formations established in 1947
667
667
Military units and formations disestablished in 1954